GNU cflow is a flow graph generator that is part of the GNU Project. It reads a collection of C source files and generates a C flow graph of external references. It uses only sources and doesn't need to run the program.

History 
It was initially an implementation of the UNIX utility cflow.

cflow (UNIX utility) 
cflow is a Unix command generating a C-language flowgraph.

Besides GNU, there are other implementations of cflow, like the one for Tru64 Unix.

References

External links 
 Source code on the GNU Savannah platform.
 GNU cflow on the Free Software Directory.

C (programming language)
cflow
Compiler construction
Free documentation generators